Below are the full rosters and coaching staff of the 44 teams of Minor League Baseball's Dominican Summer League.

Boca Chica North Division

Boca Chica South Division

Boca Chica Northeast Division

Boca Chica Northwest Division

Boca Chica Baseball City Division

San Pedro de Macoris Division

Dominican Summer League
Rosters